Glen is a town in Montgomery County, New York, United States.  The population was 2,507 at the 2010 census. The town was named after Jacob Glen, an early landowner.

The Town of Glen is centrally located in the county, southwest of the City of Amsterdam.

History 

Glen was inside the original Town of Mohawk, which was subdivided out of existence.  
Glen was first settled by European colonists in the 18th century, circa  1725. The Town was formed in 1823 from the Town of Charleston.

In 1848, a larger concentrated settlement in the town along the Mohawk River incorporated as the village of Fultonville.  Other notable settlements in the Town include the hamlets of Glen, Mill Point, Auriesville, and Stone Ridge.

Geography

The Mohawk River forms the northern town boundary, and the Schoharie Creek forms the eastern town line.

The New York State Thruway (Interstate 90) crosses the northern part of Glen at the south bank of the Mohawk River.  New York State Route 5S parallels the Thruway.  New York State Route 30A is a north–south highway that intersects New York State Route 161 in the hamlet of Glen.

Demographics

As of the census of 2000, there were 2,222 people, 781 households, and 567 families residing in the town.  The population density was 57.4 people per square mile (22.2/km2).  There were 863 housing units at an average density of 22.3 per square mile (8.6/km2). The racial makeup of the town was 95.59% White, 1.98% African-American, 0.23% Native American, 0.95% Asian, 0.14% from other races, and 1.13% from two or more races. Hispanic or Latino of any race was 2.25% of the population.

There were 781 households, out of which 35.5% had children under the age of 18 living with them, 55.8% were married couples living together, 11.0% had a female householder with no husband present, and 27.4% were non-families. 21.0% of all households were made up of individuals, and 9.0% had someone living alone who was 65 years of age or older.  The average household size was 2.64 and the average family size was 3.06.

In the town, the population was spread out, with 25.7% under the age of 18, 8.2% from 18 to 24, 29.6% from 25 to 44, 23.3% from 45 to 64, and 13.3% who were 65 years of age or older.  The median age was 37 years. For every 100 females, there were 109.6 males.  For every 100 females age 18 and over, there were 109.6 males.

The median income for a household in the town was $41,307, and the median income for a family was $44,674. Males had a median income of $32,473 versus $22,642 for females. The per capita income for the town was $17,583.  About 3.0% of families and 6.0% of the population were below the poverty line, including 3.8% of those under the age 18 and 9.6% of those age 65 or over.

Communities and locations in Glen 
Auries Creek – A tributary of the Mohawk in the central part of Glen. The name is derived from a native who lived in the area.
Auriesville – A hamlet on the Mohawk River in the northeastern part of the town, on NY-5S.  Believed to have been developed at the site of a Mohawk village known as Ossernenon, this was the site of the killings of Jesuit missionaries, one in 1642 and two in 1646, by Mohawk. They are among the eight North American Martyrs canonized in 1930 and venerated by the Roman Catholic Church.
Fultonville – The Village of Fultonville is in the northern part of the Town, next to the Mohawk River at NY-5S and NY-30A.
Glen – The hamlet of Glen is in the center of the Town at the intersection of NY-161 and NY-30A. The community was originally called "Vorheesville" and "Five Corners." The Glen Historic District was listed on the National Register of Historic Places in 2001.
Square Barn Corners – A location between Fultonville and Glen village on NY-30A.
Stone Ridge – A hamlet on the western town boundary, at the Mohawk River and NY-5S.
Van Wie Creek – A tributary of the Mohawk in the northwestern part of Glen.

References

External links
  Town of Glen, NY Website
  Historical Information for Town of Glen, NY
  Historical Information
 Fonda-Fultonville Local School District

Towns in Montgomery County, New York
1823 establishments in New York (state)
Populated places on the Mohawk River